Mibambwe III Mutabazi II Sentabyo, also known as Mhwerazikamwa, (reigned 1741 – 1746) was a Mwami; Umwami wimye Ingoma Habaye Ubwirakabiri of the Kingdom of Rwanda during the eighteenth century. He succeeded Kigeli III Ndabarasa. The start of his reign was marked by two eclipses (Ubwirakabiri); the most officially coinciding with his intronization being that of June 13, 1741, and another one on April 13, 1763.

References

18th-century monarchs in Africa
Rwandan kings